Krieg und Frieden (Music for Theatre) is a studio album by Apparat. It was released on Mute Records on 15 February 2013. The album is a music adaption based on a score for a theatrical production of War and Peace.

Critical reception

At Metacritic, which assigns a weighted average score out of 100 to reviews from mainstream critics, the album received an average score of 70, based on 11 reviews, indicating "generally favorable reviews".

Track listing

Personnel
Credits adapted from liner notes.

 Sascha Ring – performance, production, mixing
 Christoph Mäckie Hartmann – performance
 Phillip Thimm – performance
 Nackt – production
 Jörg Wähner – additional drums
 Christian Kolhaas – trombone (6)
 Giovanni Nicoletta – recording
 Kai Blankenberg – mastering
 Tilo Baumgärtel – cover art
 Kiosk Royal – layout

Charts

References

External links
 

2013 albums
Apparat (musician) albums
Mute Records albums
War and Peace
Music based on novels
Adaptations of works by Leo Tolstoy